Clarksburg is a hamlet  in the town of Eden in Erie County, New York, United States.

Notable person

Football player William Wurtenburg (1863–1957) was born at Clarksburg.

References

Hamlets in New York (state)
Hamlets in Erie County, New York